Dăeni is a commune in Tulcea County, Northern Dobruja, Romania. It is composed of a single village, Dăeni.

References

External links

Communes in Tulcea County
Localities in Northern Dobruja